Claudine Dupuis (born Andrée Esther Chaloum; 1 May 1924 in Paris – 26 May 1991 in Lisieux) was a French actress. She starred as the "garrulous prostitute Manon" in Henri-Georges Clouzot's  Quai des Orfèvres in 1947. Other films include The Fighting Men (1950), Il bivio (1951), The Babes Make the Law (1955), La fierecilla domada (1956) and Cuatro en la frontera (1958). She was married to Alfred Rode from 1951.

Selected filmography
 François Villon (1945)
 Devil and the Angel (1946)
 Secret Cargo (1947)
 The Crossroads (1951)
 It's the Paris Life (1954)
 Ball of Nations (1954)
 The Babes Make the Law (1955)
 Beatrice Cenci (1956)
 The Babes in the Secret Service (1956)

References

External links 
 

French film actresses
1924 births
1994 deaths
Actresses from Paris
20th-century French actresses